Saint-Cyprien is a commune in the Dordogne department in Nouvelle-Aquitaine in southwestern France.

It serves as the seat of the canton of Vallée Dordogne. It is the most populous commune in the canton. Saint-Cyprien station has rail connections to Bordeaux, Périgueux and Sarlat-la-Canéda.

Population

Personality
 Joséphine Baker was the godmother of Saint-Cyprien Athletic club "(SCAC) rugby
 Bertrand de Got (1264-1314), Archbishop of Bordeaux, future Pope Clement V, places the monastery of Saint-Cyprien under his jurisdiction.

See also
Communes of the Dordogne department
Gare de Saint-Cyprien

References

External links

 Saint-Cyprien on the Quid site

Communes of Dordogne